Kosalananda Kavyam is a Sanskrit work written on a palm-leaf manuscript in Odia script, in 1663 CE by Pandit Gangadhara Mishra. The work is an important epic of Sanskrit literature about the history of Chauhan rule in Western Odisha region. Pandit Mishra was the court poet of Sambalpur King Baliarsingh Deva (1650–89 CE). He was born at Biraramchandrapur sasana of Puri and was the descendant of Sambhukara and Vidyakara, scholars and poets of Puri.

See also
Patna State
Sambalpur State
Sonepur State

References

External links
History of Sonepur
Sanskrit Scholars of Orissa
Kosalananda Mahakavya in Eastern Book Corporation
Srikshetra and Sri Jagannath in Gangadhar Mishra's Kosalananda Kavyam

Indian literature
Odia literature
Sanskrit texts
History books about India
Cultural history of Odisha